Bernard Shields (1833 - 20 April 1887) was a private in the United States Army who was awarded the Medal of Honor for gallantry during the American Civil War. He was awarded the medal on 3 May 1865 for actions performed at the Battle of Appomattox Station in April 1865.

Personal life 
Shields was born in 1833 in Ireland. He married Anna Friel and fathered four children. He died in Ohio on 20 April 1887 and was buried in Mount Calvary Cemetery in Columbus, Ohio.

Military service 
Shields enlisted in the Army on 19 September 1861 as a private and was assigned to Company K of the 2nd West Virginia Cavalry. On 23 November 1864 he was reassigned to Company E of the same unit. On 8 April 1865, at the Battle of Appomattox Station, he captured the flag of the Washington Artillery, a Confederate unit.

Shields' Medal of Honor citation reads:

Shields was mustered out of the Army on 30 June 1865.

References 

American Civil War recipients of the Medal of Honor
United States Army Medal of Honor recipients
1833 births
1887 deaths